Struble may refer to:
 Struble, Iowa, United States

Struble is the surname of:
 Arthur Dewey Struble (1894–1983), American admiral
 Doris June Struble (1895-1976), American pianist, singer, dramatic reader
 Eva Struble (born 1981), American painters
 George R. Struble (1836–1918), Speaker of the Iowa House, 1882–84
 Isaac S. Struble (1843–1913), American congressman, 1883–1891
 J. Curtis Struble (born 1953), U.S. diplomat
 John T. Struble (1828–1916), Iowa City pioneer
 Bob Struble (1899–1967), welfare reformer
 Robert Struble Jr. (1943–2016), author, teacher
 Sloan Struble (born 1999), American singer, songwriter, and producer, best known as frontman for indie pop band Dayglow.

See also
 Antje Rávic Strubel (born 1974), German writer